Christian McLaughlin is an American film producer.

Personal life
Christian McLaughlin is originally from Dover, Massachusetts and is a graduate of Colgate University. In 2011 Christian produced A Better Life, directed by Chris Weitz and starring Demián Bichir for which he was nominated for an Academy Award for Best Actor.

Filmography

References

External links

Living people
Year of birth missing (living people)
Film producers from New York (state)
Colgate University alumni